250 West Pratt Street is a highrise building located in Baltimore, Maryland. The building was constructed and completed in 1986, designed by Skidmore, Owings and Merrill LLP., and originally developed by and for Cabot, Cabot & Forbes. The building is located in the center of Baltimore's central commercial district, and is the building most visible from Oriole Park at Camden Yards.

In early 2015 Danish jewelry maker Pandora Jewelry moved 600 employees and its regional headquarters for the Americas to the building. As part of a ten-year lease, the company's logo will be added to the building, visible from the street and from Camden Yards.

See also
List of tallest buildings in Baltimore

References

External links

Drawings of 250 West Pratt Street

Downtown Baltimore
Office buildings completed in 1986
Skidmore, Owings & Merrill buildings
Skyscraper office buildings in Baltimore